Nick Macarchuk (born June 26, 1941) is a former men's college basketball head coach. He was the head coach at Canisius, Fordham, and Stony Brook.

He was honored with the 1987 Norwich Native Son Award.

Head coaching record

References

1941 births
Living people
American men's basketball coaches
American men's basketball players
Basketball coaches from Connecticut
Basketball players from Connecticut
Canisius Golden Griffins men's basketball coaches
College men's basketball head coaches in the United States
Fairfield Stags men's basketball players
Fordham Rams men's basketball coaches
Providence Friars men's basketball coaches
Sportspeople from Norwich, Connecticut
Stony Brook Seawolves men's basketball coaches